Joseph Aoun (born March 26, 1953) is a Lebanese-born American linguist and academic administrator, currently serving as the 7th president of Northeastern University in Boston since August 2006. Previously, Aoun was dean of the College of Letters, Arts, and Sciences at the University of Southern California. He joined USC in 1982 in the Department of Linguistics, and during his time at USC served as head of the academic Senate. 

As a theoretical syntactician, he is known for his work on logical form and wh-movement.

Biography
Joseph E. Aoun was born in the Lebanese capital of Beirut. He earned a Masters in Oriental Languages and Literature at the Université Saint-Joseph in Beirut in 1975, a Diploma of Advanced Studies in General and Theoretical Linguistics at the University of Paris VIII in 1977, and a PhD in Linguistics at Massachusetts Institute of Technology in 1981. He joined the University of Southern California (USC) in 1982 as a Linguistics Professor. During his time at USC, he served as president of head and eventually became a Dean. His success in fund-raising allowed for the hiring of multiple professors, the creation of named chairs backed by endowments, and the creation of two new sub-departments for the study of Armenian and Korean.

He is married to his wife Zeina; the couple has two sons, Adrian and Joseph Karim.

Aoun was hired by Northeastern University in Boston in 2006 to serve as university president; one of the main duty of presidents is generally to manage fundraising and budgets, which Aoun was not adept at. While at Northeastern, he and the Board of Trustees oversaw the cancelling of the Northeastern Huskies football program. The program was 8-26 in its preceding three seasons and faced declining attendance and high costs if it wished to remain competitive in recruiting. The move, while controversial, was generally considered positive in retrospect; the funding it freed up allowed for the construction of the Interdisciplinary Science and Engineering Complex, which played more directly into Northeastern's strengths. Aoun later said he was overwhelmed with calls from other college presidents asking how he managed the feat without enraging alumni.

Aoun's 2018 salary was around $1.5–1.8 million dollars. In Spring 2020, Aoun announced he would donate 20% of his annual salary (~$290,000) to new funds meant to support students facing economic hardship as a result of the COVID-19 pandemic and to support research programs related to the crisis.

Robot-Proof 
Robot-Proof: Higher Education in the Age of Artificial Intelligence was published and released in 2017 by MIT Press. The book appeared over a year after Aoun wrote a commentary for the Chronicle of Higher Education that shares the first part of the book's title.

In Robot-Proof, Aoun proposes a way to educate the next generation of college students to invent, to create, and to discover—to fill needs in society that even the most sophisticated artificial intelligence agent cannot.

A "robot-proof" education, Aoun argues, is not concerned solely with memorizing facts. Rather, it fosters a creative mindset and the mental elasticity to invent, discover, or create something valuable to society—a scientific proof, a hip-hop recording, a web comic, a cure for cancer. In his book, Aoun lays out the framework for a new discipline, humanics, which builds on our innate strengths and prepares students to compete in a labor market in which smart machines work alongside human professionals. 

He argues for the need for better and continuous education to keep up with changing technology, saying, "Beyond simply conferring degrees, the foundational purpose of colleges and universities must be to educate — and that means equipping people of all ages, at all stages of their careers, to build successful and fulfilling lives."

Honors and awards
Chevalier de La Légion d’honneur (Knight of the Legion of Honor): French Government, 2018
Fellow of the American Association for the Advancement of Science, 2013
Fellow of the Linguistic Society of America, 2011
Fellow of the American Academy of Arts and Sciences, 2010
Doctor of Humane Letters: Anatolia College, 2009
Doctor of Humane Letters, honoris causa: Hebrew Union College, 2007
Chevalier de L'ordre des Palmes Academiques (Knight of the Order of the Academic Palms): French Government, 2006
Endowed Chair, Anna H. Bing Dean's Chair in the College of Letters, Arts and Sciences
MIT Robert A. Muh Alumni Award in the Humanities, Arts, and Social Sciences, 2011
USC Associates Award For Creativity In Research And Scholarship, 1997
USC Phi Kappa Phi Faculty Recognition Award, Award for The Syntax of Scope (with A. Li), 1993
USC Phi Kappa Phi Faculty Recognition Award, Award for A Grammar of Anaphora, 1988

See also
Generative linguistics
David Pesetsky
Hagit Borer
Richard S. Kayne
Howard Lasnik

References

External links
Higher education for the AI age: Let’s think about it before the machines do it for us The Washington Post 10.27.16
Doubling Down on Innovation for Success, The Chronicle of Higher Education 10.10.16
Hybrid Jobs Call for Hybrid Education, Harvard Business Review 4.12.16
Robot-Proof: How Colleges Can Keep People Relevant in the Workplace, The Chronicle of Higher Education 1.27.16
The Viral President, Photos & Videos of President Aoun, Northeastern University
An Education Mission for Our Veterans, Real Clear Education 11.11.14
The Global Eduplex, Boston Globe 9.26.14
Beyond the limits of traditional learning, Times Higher Education 6.26.14
Let's Get Engaged, Real Clear Education 5.14.14
To Meet President Obama's Jobs Goal, Involve All Colleges, Bloomberg Businessweek 1.29.14
Giving students an enterprising path to start on, Boston Globe 2.16.13
A shakeup of higher education, Boston Globe 11.17.12
Northeastern president makes wise use of YouTube, Boston Globe 11.11.12
Northeastern president named to Homeland Security council, Boston Globe 03.04.12
President Aoun talks about the cost and value of higher education in America, 90.9 WBUR Radio Boston, 02.08.12
Joseph Aoun On Northeastern University’s National Expansion, 90.9 WBUR Radio Boston 11.04.11
Northeastern University looks southeast to Charlotte, The Charlotte Observer 11.01.11
U. Opens the First in a Planned Series of Graduate Campuses Across the U.S., The Chronicle of Higher Education 11.01.11
Northeastern putting down stakes across the country, Boston Globe 10.31.11
Guest post: A clear path to a post-collegiate job, The Washington Post 10.12.11
President Aoun and Entrepreneur Peter Thiel Debate the Value of College, 90.9 WBUR Radio Boston 06.30.11
A college education is your best bet, CNN 6.9.11
Learning Today: the Lasting Value of Place, The Chronicle of Higher Education 5.8.11
The costs of cutting higher ed, Boston Globe 12.15.10
Game Changer, The Presidency (American Council on Education Magazine) Fall 2010
Expand students' global experiences, Politico 8.24.10
Protect Unpaid Internships, Inside Higher Ed 7.13.10
Saving Public Higher Ed, Inside Higher Ed 10.1.09
Millions more going to college?, Boston Globe 7.16.09
Fast-rising NU reexamines its identity, Boston Globe 4.6.09
Joseph Aoun: Finding Opportunities in the Recession, The Chronicle of Higher Education 1.30.09
Boston and its colleges need to nurture unique partnership, Boston Globe 2.17.09

1953 births
Fellows of the American Academy of Arts and Sciences
Lebanese emigrants to the United States
21st-century linguists
Living people
MIT School of Humanities, Arts, and Social Sciences alumni
Scientists from Beirut
University of Southern California faculty
Academic staff of Paris 8 University Vincennes-Saint-Denis
University of Paris alumni
American expatriates in France
Fellows of the American Association for the Advancement of Science
Fellows of the Linguistic Society of America
Presidents of Northeastern University